Massepha bengalensis is a moth in the family Crambidae. It was described by Frederic Moore in 1892. It is found in north-eastern India.

References

Moths described in 1892
Pyraustinae